The House in Montevideo is a 1963 German comedy film directed by Helmut Käutner and starring Heinz Rühmann, Ruth Leuwerik and Paul Dahlke. 

Professor Traugott Nägler, a man with high moral standards, once has repudiated his underage sister for having a baby out of wedlock. Many years later, having a loving wife and twelve children with only the small salary of a schoolmaster, he is told that said sister has died in South America, and that he should come with his oldest yet still underage daughter, Atlanta, who was named after the ship on which the couple was married at sea by the captain. In Uruguay, they find out that the sister had made a fortune and owned a house in Montevideo, an etablissement with several young ladies, that Atlanta inherits some money as marriage portion, and that a large amount of money could be inherited by the first underage female member in his house that behaves in the same disreputable way as the sister once did involuntarily. Not daring to tell his daughter Atlanta about the stipulation, and definitely not her younger sisters, he is anyway tempted to make helpful suggestions to her, and especially to her suitor who had followed them secretly. When the young couple wants to have their wedding on the same ship as her parents, they find out that size matters, and that Prof. Nägler has led a far more immoral life than his sister ever did.

The film was based on the 1945 play The House in Montevideo by Curt Goetz, which had previously been turned into a film in 1951.

It was shot at the Bavaria Studios in Munich. The film's sets were designed by the art directors Isabella Schlichting and Werner Schlichting.

Cast
Heinz Rühmann as Prof. Dr. Traugott Hermann Nägler
Ruth Leuwerik as Marianne Nägler
Paul Dahlke as Pastor Riesling
Hanne Wieder as Carmen de la Rocco
Ilse Pagé as Atlanta
Michael Verhoeven as Herbert
Viktor de Kowa as Anwalt
Fritz Tillmann as Bürgermeister
Elfie Fiegert as Belinda
Doris Kiesow as Martha
Herbert Kroll as Apotheker
Georg Gütlich as Oberst
Pierre Franckh as Lohengrin

References

External links

1963 films
1963 comedy films
Constantin Film films
German films based on plays
Films based on works by Curt Goetz
Films directed by Helmut Käutner
Films set in Montevideo
Films set in the 1900s
German comedy films
Remakes of German films
1960s German-language films
West German films
Films shot at Bavaria Studios
1960s German films